Planchonia is a genus of trees and shrubs in the family Lecythidaceae first described as a genus in 1851. It is native to Southeast Asia, Papuasia, and Australia.

Accepted species
 Planchonia brevistipitata Kuswata – Sabah 
 Planchonia careya  (F.Muell.) R.Knuth – cockatoo apple, cocky apple or billygoat plum – New Guinea, Queensland, Northern Territory, Western Australia 
 Planchonia grandis Ridl. – Peninsular Malaysia, Borneo, Sumatra 
 Planchonia papuana R.Knuth – New Guinea, Solomon Islands, Aru 
 Planchonia rupestris  R.L.Barrett & M.D.Barrett – Western Australia 
 Planchonia spectabilis Merr. – Luzon, Mindanao 
 Planchonia timorensis Blume – Timor 
 Planchonia valida (Blume) Blume – Andaman & Nicobar, Peninsular Malaysia, Borneo, Sumatra, Lesser Sunda Islands, Sulawesi, Java

References

External links

 
Ericales genera